Active Member is a Greek hip-hop/low bap group, founded in 1992 by Michalis Mitakidis (a.k.a. B.D. Foxmoor) and Dimitris Kritikos (a.k.a. DJ MCD).

History

Background and early years 
Perama was always considered to be underdeveloped. This is partly due to the fact that the first inhabitants of Perama, in the early 1920s, were refugees from Asia Minor. The residents fought for years with unemployment and the conflicting interests around the ship repair zone — a key center for the local economy. In such a place, it is common for young talented people to be forced to give up their dreams, their studies and their career for a job in the boats. All of the above tortured the mind of young Michael Mytakidis, who lived there.

Mytakidis (or B.D. Foxmoor) was keeping track of the hip hop music and its evolution since 1979. In an effort to make hip hop better known in Greece, he brought together people with common concerns. Then, having a few financial and technical resources, these people put a common goal, to build the foundation for a conscious music scene in Greece.

History 
In June 1992, the B.D. Foxmoor (Michael Mytakidis) with Dj MCD (Dimitris Kritikos), he founded the first Greek hip hop music group, named Active Member. The people associated with this effort then created the independent record label Freestyle Productions.

In 1993, Active Member released their first album. The second followed in 1994. Both albums were released by Freestyle Productions.

In 1995, hip hop music was still virtually unknown in Greece. She, therefore, the time of the Active Member drew the attention of record companies in the course of a live in a large concert hall in Athens. The lyrics, their performance and their contact with the audience played a crucial role. Active Member were the first greek hip hop group that signed a contract with a multinational company, Warner Music. Within a few months they released their third album titled "The Big Trick", which made them widely known.

Influence 
Being the first Greek low bap group to release an album, Active Member had dominated the hip-hop scene in Greece for many years. Although the genre had already existed for more than a decade, it was still unknown to the majority of Greeks in the early 90s. However, the group redefined their music in 1995 with the release of the record To Megalo Kolpo (The Big Trick). Their newly founded subgenre has since then been called Low Bap and it is characterized by the slow bass, rhythm, and the emphasis on lyrics.

Presently, the group is one of the most widely recognized in Greece, staying away from the rest of the Greek hip-hop scene though. They are deeply involved in the music industry and community, organizing events such as the annual Low Bap Festival in Athens. They also encourage the youth to enter the scene. Additionally, they have released records comprised by demo songs sent to them by new performers.

Freestyle Productions 

In 1996 they released their fourth, and in 1998 their fifth album. From 1996 until the end of 1999, Freestyle Productions had released three album collections, two personal albums of members of the Active Member, a tray for DJs and five other low bap works. Some of them were independent productions, and some were released in conjunction with Warner Music and EMI. At the same time, the company maintained a radio broadcast to a large Athenian station.

Members 
Current members

 B.D. Foxmoor (1992-present)
 Sadahzinia (2003-present)

Past members

 DJ MCD (1992-1996)
 X-Ray (1993-2002)
 Real-D (1993-1997)
 DJ Booker (2002-2006)

Discography 

LPs
Diamartyria (Protest) (Freestyle Productions, LP 1993)
Stin Ora Ton Skion (In the Hour of the Shadows) (Freestyle Productions, LP, 1994)
To Megalo Kolpo (The Big Game) (Warner, CD/LP, 1995)
Apo Ton Topo Tis Fygis (From Run Away Land) (Warner, CD/2LP, 1996
Mythoi Tou Valtou (Myths from the Moor) (Warner, CD/2LP, 1998)
Meres Paraxenes, Thavmasies Meres (Weird Days, Beautiful Days) (Warner, CD, 2000)
Live/Remix (Warner, 2CD, 2000)
Ston Kairo tou Allokotou Fovou (In Times of Weird Fear) (Warner, CD/2LP, 2001)
Perasma sto akroneiro (Passage to the Edge of a Dream) (Warner, CD, 2002)
Fiera (Warner, CD, 2004)
Ap' to Megalo Kolpo sti Fiera (From Big Game to Fiera) (Warner, CD, 2005)
Blah-Blasphemy (8ctagon, CD+DVD, 2005)
Klassika ki agapimena (live hxografisi apo no sponsors jam) (CD, 2007)
Skieratsa (Shadow-race) [including: Blah-Blasphemy 2, Bathiskiota (Deep Shadowed), Apnoia (Calm) (8ctagon, 3CD, 2006)
Ap'tis ftiaxis mas ta lathia ( Ep1, Ep2, Ep3, diplo CD kai DVD, apli kai syllektiki ekdosi) (8ctagon, 2009)
Ston vouvon tin eschatia (At the extreme end of the mutes) (Imantas, CD, 2011)
Arsenali (simple edition) (Imantas, 2CD, 2012)
Cosmos Alivas (Self-released, 2LP, 2014)
Zaliki (Talkback, 2CD, 2017)
Friktoria (Talkback, 2020)

CD singles
Akou Mana (Listen Up, Mother) (Warner, promo maxi 12",1995)
Prosfigas (Refugee) (Warner, promo maxi 12",1996)
Gia Ta Aderfia Pou Hathikane Noris (Dedicated to the Lost Brothers) (Warner, CD single, 1997)
2/12/2002 (Warner, CD single, 2002)
Hreose ta sti fotia/Hreose ta ki afta sti fotia  (7" vinyl, 2007)
Fysaei kontra (7" vinyl, 2008)

External links
 Low bap Website
 

Greek hip hop groups